Spodnje Laze is a settlement in the Municipality of Gorje in the Upper Carniola region of Slovenia.

References

External links
Spodnje Laze on Geopedia

Populated places in the Municipality of Gorje